Munduruku bicoloratum is a theraphosid spider, endemic to Brazil, and is the only species in the monotypic genus Munduruku.

Etymology
The generic name "Munduruku" comes from the Munduruku people, who inhabited the region where the types were collected. The specific name "bicoloratum" comes from Latin, meaning "two-coloured" referring to the abdominal colours.

Classification
Munduruku bicoloratum could be placed in the genus Plesiopelma, but its characteristics show that this would broaden the diagnostic features of this genus too much, therefore causing it to become a nonmonophyletic group.

Characteristics
This genus has a unique abdominal pattern, and has a sub-apical keel on the embolus. It also has urticating hair type III in the male, and types III and IV in the female. It also lacks a process on the first male metatarsus and has a tibial spur that has fused bases and converging branches.

References

Theraphosidae
Spiders of Brazil
Spiders described in 2013